Eduardo Rafael Cáceres Lehnhoff (2 June 1906 – 31 January 1980) was a Guatemalan politician who served as Vice President from 1 July 1970 to 1 July 1974 in the cabinet of Carlos Arana.

He was killed on 31 January 1980 in the Burning of the Spanish Embassy in Guatemala-City.

References

Vice presidents of Guatemala
People of the Guatemalan Civil War
People murdered in Guatemala
Guatemalan murder victims
Deaths from fire
1980 deaths
1906 births